Geneva Township is one of eleven townships in Jennings County, Indiana, United States.  As of the 2010 census, its population was 7,584 and it contained 3,365 housing units.

History
Geneva Township was established in about 1824. A majority of the first settlers being natives of Switzerland caused the name Geneva to be selected.

Geography
The streams of Bear Creek, Bennetts Branch, Nettle Creek, Rattail Creek, Rock Creek and Wyaloosing Creek run through this township.

Unincorporated towns
 Country Squire Lakes
 Queensville
 Scipio

Adjacent townships
 Rock Creek Township, Bartholomew County (north)
 Jackson Township, Decatur County (northeast)
 Sand Creek Township (east)
 Center Township (southeast)
 Spencer Township (south)
 Redding Township, Jackson County (southwest)
 Sand Creek Township, Bartholomew County (west)

Cemeteries
The township contains three cemeteries: Cave Springs, Henry and Hulse.

Major highways
  Indiana State Road 7

Airports and landing strips
 Miller and Sons Farm Supply Airport

References
 
 United States Census Bureau cartographic boundary files

External links
 Indiana Township Association
 United Township Association of Indiana

Townships in Jennings County, Indiana
Townships in Indiana